Several space objects and features have been named after Thai people or things in Thailand. These include planetary features on Mars and Venus, asteroids and exoplanets.

Stars and exoplanets
 Chalawan, Taphao Thong and Taphao Kaew: the star 47 Ursae Majoris and two of its planets, 47 Ursae Majoris b and 47 Ursae Majoris c - named after characters of the folktale Kraithong
 Chao Phraya and Mae Ping: the star WASP-50 and its planet WASP-50 b - named after the Chao Phraya River and its tributary the Mae Ping

Planetary features

Venus
 Dhorani Corona - after Phra Mae Thorani, the Thai earth goddess
 Phra Naret Corona - after King Naresuan, although the IAU refers to a goddess of fertility

Mars
 Chatturat crater - after Chatturat District, Chaiyaphum
 Kantang crater - after Kantang District, Trang
 Nan crater - after Nan Province
 Phon crater - after Phon District, Khon kaen
 Tak crater - after Tak Province
 Thom crater - unclear provenance, possibly Na Thom District, Nakhon Phanom
 Yala crater - after Yala Province
 Dao Vallis - after dao, the Thai word for 'star/planet'

Asteroids
According to the National Astronomical Research Institute of Thailand (NARIT), eleven minor planets were named after Thai people and organizations as of 2019. (However, NARIT failed to account for seven entries; the correct number is eighteen.) The named minor planets, in order of naming date, are:

 7604 Kridsadaporn (1995 QY2) - after Kridsadaporn (San) Ritsmitchai (1964–2004), Thai astronomer
 21464 Chinaroonchai (1998HH88) - after Tanongsak Chinaroonchai, Thai finalist in the 2006 Intel ISEF
 21540 Itthipanyanan (1998QE11)
 21632 Suwanasri (1999NR11) - after Krongrath Suwanasri, Thai finalist in the 2006 Intel ISEF
 23310 Siriwon (2001 AA25)
 23308 Niyomsatian (2001 AS21) - after Korawich Niyomsatian, Thai winner of the 2007 Intel ISEF
 23313 Supokaivanich (2001 AC42)
 28418 Pornwasu (1999 VQ54)
 28419 Tanpitcha (1999 VA67)
 151834 Mongkut (2003 FB122)
 31938 Nattapong (2000 GL99)
 31939 Thananon (2000 GC101)
 31940 Sutthiluk (2000 GQ104)
 13957 NARIT (1991 AG2) - after National Astronomical Research Institute of Thailand (NARIT)
 6125 Singto (1989 CN) - after Singto Pukahuta (1915–2007), a prominent Thai astronomy educator and author
 33536 Charpugdee (1999 HU9) - after Runglawan Charpugdee, who was awarded the second place in the 2016 Intel ISEF
 33537 Doungnga (1999 HJ10) - after Charuntorn Doungnga, who was awarded the second place in the 2016 Intel ISEF
 45692 Poshyachinda (2000 EJ148) - after Saran Poshyachinda (born 1964), the executive director of the National Astronomical Research Institute of Thailand

References

Astronomy in Thailand
Astronomical nomenclature by nation
 space